St Chad's Church, Far Headingley is the parish church of Far Headingley in Leeds, West Yorkshire, England. The church is Grade II* listed in Gothic Revival style. The dedication is to Chad of Mercia, who was bishop of York and died in AD 672. It is set back from the busy Otley Road, with a cricket field and the parish war memorial (Grade II listed) nearer the road.

History
The church was built in 1868, on land given by the Beckett family of Kirkstall Grange who paid £10,000 towards it. The architects were Edmund Beckett Denison and W. H. Crossland.

In 1909-11 it was modified, removing the octagonal apse  and replacing it with a rectangular chancel and adding a Lady chapel and an organ chamber to the sides.  The organ was also built at this time, to fit into the new space.  It was constructed by Harrison & Harrison of Durham, rebuilt in 1988 with electric power and refurbished in 2011, along with a reordering of the church interior. The Creation window above the altar was designed and made by M. E. Aldrich Rope in 1922.

In 2002 the Lady Chapel was renamed the Chapel of St Oswald, when St Oswald's church in Meanwood closed.  A glass partition was installed.

St Chad's has won an "Eco-congregation" award, and in November 2007 the church won the Church Times national award for biodiversity in recognition of its wildlife-friendly churchyard.

Use in television
The church has been used on multiple occasions by Yorkshire Television as a filming location including for Fat Friends and At Home with the Braithwaites.

See also
Listed buildings in Leeds (Weetwood Ward)

References

External links

 Church website

Churches in Leeds
Listed buildings in Leeds
Grade II* listed churches in West Yorkshire
Church of England church buildings in West Yorkshire
Headingley
Anglican Diocese of Leeds
Churches completed in 1868
19th-century Church of England church buildings
Gothic Revival architecture in Leeds